Norton is a location in Yuma County, Arizona, United States. It is located in the northeast San Cristobal Valley, directly south of the Roll Industrial Lead. In the early 20th century, it was on the main road between Yuma and Phoenix. In 1920, there were 38 inhabitants of the "Norton Precinct". A 1923 publication reported that there were some ranch buildings and one closed store that once held a post office. The Norton post office was discontinued in 1925.

References

Populated places in Yuma County, Arizona